State of Green is a not-for-profit, public–private partnership promoting Danish cleantech solutions concerning climate change.

Organisational purpose and activities

State of Green focuses its efforts around four global challenges.  
 Powering our future with sustainable energy
 Ensuring water security for a growing world
 Creating smart and liveable cities
 Moving towards a circular economy

House of Green 

On September 5, 2013, House of Green was inaugurated by H.R.H. Crown Prince Frederik of Denmark, the official patron of State of Green.
House of Green was a project intended to be a unique visitor and exhibition centre with meeting facilities and a showroom, where Danish businesses, industry organisations and public institutions could welcome foreign commercial and political decision-makers and introduce them to the Danish competencies within clean-tech.

On February 5, 2019, House of Green was re-inaugurated by the Crown Prince after a comprehensive modernisation of the centre.

The platform 
In 2018, the organisation re-launched the website into a platform, where Danish companies, organizations and authorities within the energy, water, cities and circular economy can present and market their green efforts. The aim of the platform was to create knowledge and relationships between stakeholders working for green and innovative solutions. The scope of the organisation was inherently international, focusing on the possibilities of using Danish cleantech solutions in foreign markets.

Historical context 

Until the late 1970s, Denmark was almost exclusively dependent on fossil fuels. The 1973 oil crisis and the 1979 energy crisis were wake-up calls for the country, realising the need for diversifying and securing renewable energy sources.

COP 15 
Between 7th and December 18, 2009, COP15 (also known as the Copenhagen Summit), was held in Copenhagen. 
State of Green, at the time known as Climate Consortium Denmark, was an integrated part of the official portfolio of activities before, during and after the COP15.

Energy Strategy 2050 
In February 2011, Danish government announced its "Energy Strategy 2050" with the aim to be fully independent of fossil fuels by 2050, and a new government repeated the goal in 2015 despite public scepticism.

Communicating the Danish example – Decoupling growth and energy consumption
Until the late 1970s Denmark was almost exclusively dependent on fossil fuels. The 1973 oil crisis and the 1979 energy crisis were wake-up calls for the country. Working consistently with both the supply and demand structure of the energy-market, Denmark has managed to sustain consistent economic growth while keeping energy consumption nearly neutral. Since 1980 the Danish economy has grown by more than 75 percent in real terms while keeping energy consumption nearly constant and reducing CO2 emissions.

This has come about through a number of changes: government incentive schemes, including both sticks and carrots promoting renewable energy; cleantech innovations among entrepreneurs as well as established industries; and public recognition of the importance of changing energy consumption patterns.

On the supply side energy sources have been heavily diversified and now include: wind power (20% of electricity as of 2009); bio-mass including second generation bio-ethanol; gas from the North Sea and the Continent; the most energy efficient coal-fuelled combined heating power plants in the world; and ordinary gasoline fuel mainly used in transportation.

On the demand side the Danish society has undergone a fundamental change in its consumption patterns driven by an innovative industrial side, massive investments in cleantech and pricing incentives on energy. The efforts include vast reductions of energy waste in private housing and business facilities not least through efficient lighting and better building insulation, and an improving energy efficiency of industry and the agricultural sector.

References

External links

 United Nations Environmental Programme's Climate Neutral initiative

Scientific organizations based in Denmark
Climate change in Europe
Employers' organizations in Denmark